A semi-arid climate, semi-desert climate, or steppe climate is a dry climate sub-type. It is located on regions that receive precipitation below potential evapotranspiration, but not as low as a desert climate. There are different kinds of semi-arid climates, depending on variables such as temperature, and they give rise to different biomes.

Defining attributes of semi-arid climates
A more precise definition is given by the Köppen climate classification, which treats steppe climates (BSk and BSh) as intermediates between desert climates (BW) and humid climates (A, C, D) in ecological characteristics and agricultural potential. Semi-arid climates tend to support short, thorny or scrubby vegetation and are usually dominated by either grasses or shrubs as it usually can't support forests.

To determine if a location has a semi-arid climate, the precipitation threshold must first be determined. The method used to find the precipitation threshold (in millimeters):
multiply by 20 the average annual temperature in degrees Celsius and then
add 280 if at least 70% of the total precipitation falls in the summer half of the year (April–September in the northern hemisphere, October–March in the southern hemisphere)
add 140 if 30–70% of the total precipitation falls in the summer half of the year
add nothing if less than 30% of the total precipitation falls in the summer half of the year

If the area's annual precipitation in millimeters is less than the threshold but more than half or 50% the threshold, it is classified as a BS (steppe or semi-arid climate).

A location with a BS-type climate is classified as hot semi-arid (BSh) if its appropriate mean temperature is above whichever isotherm is being used, and a location with temperature below the given isotherm is classified as cold semi-arid (BSk).

Hot semi-arid climates

Hot semi-arid climates (type "BSh") tend to be located in the 20s and 30s latitudes of the tropics and subtropics, typically in proximity to regions with a tropical savanna or a humid subtropical climate. These climates tend to have hot, sometimes extremely hot, summers and warm to cool winters, with some to minimal precipitation. Hot semi-arid climates are most commonly found around the fringes of subtropical deserts.

Hot semi-arid climates are most commonly found in Africa, Australia and South Asia. In Australia, a large portion of the Outback surrounding the central desert regions lies within the hot semi-arid climate region. In South Asia, both India and sections of Pakistan experience the seasonal effects of monsoons and feature short but well-defined wet seasons, but are not sufficiently wet overall to qualify as a tropical savanna climate.

Hot semi-arid climates can be also found in parts of North America, such as most of northern Mexico, the ABC Islands, the rain shadows of Hispaniola's mountain ranges in the Dominican Republic and Haiti, most of the Southwestern United States, and sections of South America such as the sertão, the Gran Chaco, and the poleward side of the arid deserts, where they typically feature a Mediterranean precipitation pattern, with generally rainless summers and wetter winters. They are also found in few areas of Europe surrounding the Mediterranean Basin. In Europe, BSh climates are primarily found in southeastern Spain, and marginal parts of Greece, Portugal and Cyprus.

Cold semi-arid climates

Cold semi-arid climates (type "BSk") tend to be located in elevated portions of temperate zones, typically bordering a humid continental climate or a Mediterranean climate. They are also typically found in continental interiors some distance from large bodies of water. Cold semi-arid climates usually feature warm to hot dry summers, though their summers are typically not quite as hot as those of hot semi-arid climates. Unlike hot semi-arid climates, areas with cold semi-arid climates tend to have cold and possibly freezing winters. These areas usually see some snowfall during the winter, though snowfall is much lower than at locations at similar latitudes with more humid climates.

Areas featuring cold semi-arid climates tend to have higher elevations than areas with hot semi-arid climates, and tend to feature major temperature swings between day and night, sometimes by as much as 20 °C (36 °F) or more. These large diurnal temperature variations are seldom seen in hot semi-arid climates. Cold semi-arid climates at higher latitudes tend to have dry winters and wetter summers, while cold semi-arid climates at lower latitudes tend to have precipitation patterns more akin to subtropical climates, with dry summers, relatively wet winters, and even wetter springs and autumns.

Cold semi-arid climates are most commonly found in Mongolia, the Middle East and other parts of Asia and Western North America. However, they can also be found in Northern Africa, South Africa, Europe (Central parts of Spain and Turkey, Crimea and Macedonia), sections of South America and sections of interior southern Australia (e.g. Kalgoorlie and Mildura) and New Zealand (around Alexandra).

Regions of varying classification

The warm side of the isotherm of choice is classified as BSh, the cooler side as BSk. As a result of these differing definitions, some areas can have climates that are classified as either hot or cold semi-arid, depending on the isotherm used. One such location is San Diego, California (at its main airport).

Charts of selected cities

See also
 Continental climate
 Dry climate
 Desert climate
 Dust Bowl (an era of devastating dust storms, mostly in the 1930s, in semi-arid areas on the Great Plains of the United States and Prairies of Canada)
 Goyder's Line (a boundary marking the limit of semi-arid climates in the Australian state of South Australia)
 Köppen climate classification
 Palliser's Triangle (semi-arid area of Canada)
 Ustic (Soil Moisture Regime)
 Wave height

References

External links

Grasslands
Köppen climate types
Plains
Prairies